Dystrophin is a rod-shaped cytoplasmic protein, and a vital part of a protein complex that connects the cytoskeleton of a muscle fiber to the surrounding extracellular matrix through the cell membrane. This complex is variously known as the costamere or the dystrophin-associated protein complex (DAPC). Many muscle proteins, such as α-dystrobrevin, syncoilin, synemin, sarcoglycan, dystroglycan, and sarcospan, colocalize with dystrophin at the costamere. It has a molecular weight of 427 kDa 

Dystrophin is coded for by the DMD gene – the largest known human gene, covering 2.4 megabases (0.08% of the human genome) at locus Xp21. The primary transcript in muscle measures about 2,100 kilobases and takes 16 hours to transcribe; the mature mRNA measures 14.0 kilobases. The 79-exon muscle transcript codes for a protein of 3685 amino acid residues.

Spontaneous or inherited mutations in the dystrophin gene can cause different forms of muscular dystrophy, a disease characterized by progressive muscular wasting. The most common of these disorders caused by genetic defects in dystrophin is Duchenne muscular dystrophy.

Function 
Dystrophin is a protein located between the sarcolemma and the outermost layer of myofilaments in the muscle fiber (myofiber). It is a cohesive protein, linking actin filaments to other support proteins that reside on the inside surface of each muscle fiber's plasma membrane (sarcolemma). These support proteins on the inside surface of the sarcolemma in turn links to two other consecutive proteins for a total of three linking proteins. The final linking protein is attached to the fibrous endomysium of the entire muscle fiber. Dystrophin supports muscle fiber strength, and the absence of dystrophin reduces muscle stiffness, increases sarcolemmal deformability, and compromises the mechanical stability of costameres and their connections to nearby myofibrils. This has been shown in recent studies where biomechanical properties of the sarcolemma and its links through costameres to the contractile apparatus were measured, and helps to prevent muscle fiber injury. Movement of thin filaments (actin) creates a pulling force on the extracellular connective tissue that eventually becomes the tendon of the muscle. The dystrophin associated protein complex also helps scaffold various signalling and channel proteins, implicating the DAPC in regulation of signalling processes.

Pathology 

Dystrophin deficiency has been definitively established as one of the root causes of the general class of myopathies collectively referred to as muscular dystrophy. The deletions of one or several exons of the dystrophin DMD gene cause Duchenne and Becker muscular dystrophies. The large cytosolic protein was first identified in 1987 by Louis M. Kunkel, after concurrent works by Kunkel and Robert G. Worton to characterize the mutated gene that causes Duchenne muscular dystrophy (DMD). At least 9 disease-causing mutations in this gene have been discovered.

Normal skeletal muscle tissue contains only small amounts of dystrophin (about 0.002% of total muscle protein), but its absence (or abnormal expression) leads to the development of a severe and currently incurable constellation of symptoms most readily characterized by several aberrant intracellular signaling pathways that ultimately yield pronounced myofiber necrosis as well as progressive muscle weakness and fatigability. Most DMD patients become wheelchair-dependent early in life, and the gradual development of cardiac hypertrophy—a result of severe myocardial fibrosis—typically results in premature death in the first two or three decades of life.
Variants (mutations) in the DMD gene that lead to the production of too little or a defective, internally shortened but partially functional dystrophin protein, result in a display of a much milder dystrophic phenotype in affected patients, resulting in the disease known as Becker's muscular dystrophy (BMD). In some cases, the patient's phenotype is such that experts may decide differently on whether a patient should be diagnosed with DMD or BMD.
The theory currently most commonly used to predict whether a variant will result in a DMD or BMD phenotype, is the reading frame rule.

Though its role in airway smooth muscle is not well established, recent research indicates that dystrophin along with other subunits of dystrophin glycoprotein complex is associated with phenotype maturation.

Research
A number of models are used to facilitate research on DMD gene defects. These include the mdx mouse, GRMD (golden retriever muscular dystrophy) dog, and HFMD (hypertrophic feline muscular dystrophy) cat.

The mdx mouse contains a nonsense mutation in exon 23, leading to a shortened dystrophin protein. Levels of dystrophin in this model is not zero: a variety of mutation alleles exist with measurable levels certain of dystrophin isoforms. Muscle degeneration pathology is most easily visible in the diaphragm. Generally, clinically relevant pathology is observed with older mdx mice.

The GRMD dog is one of several existing dystrophin-deficient dogs identified where substantial characterization has been performed. Clinically relevant pathology can be observed at 8 weeks after birth, with continued gradual deterioration of muscle function. Muscle histology is most analogous to clinical presentation of DMD in humans with necrosis, fibrosis and regeneration.

The HFMD cat has a deletion in the promoter region of the DMD gene. Muscle histology shows necrosis but no fibrosis. Extensive hypertrophy has been observed which is thought to be responsible for shorter lifespans. Due to the hypertrophy, this model may have limited uses for DMD studies.

Therapeutic Microdystrophin
Delandistrogene Moxeparvovec - Systemic Gene Transfer with rAAVrh74.MHCK7.micro-dystrophin.

Interactions 
Dystrophin has been shown to interact with:
 DTNA,
 SNTA1, and
 SNTB1.

Neanderthal admixture
A variant of the DMD gene, which is on the X chromosome, named B006, appears to be an introgression from a Neanderthal-modern human mating.

References

Further reading

External links 

  GeneReviews/NCBI/NIH/UW entry on Dystrophinopathies
 
 LOVD mutation database: DMD, DMD (whole exon changes)

Cytoskeleton
Muscular dystrophy
Cell adhesion proteins